Paper Spiders is a 2020 American drama film directed by Inon Shampanier, written by Natalie and Inon Shampanier, and starring Lili Taylor and Stefania LaVie Owen. It tells the story of a high school girl struggling to help her mother, whose paranoid delusions spiral out of control. It is described as "a bittersweet story about coming of age in the shadow of mental illness."

Cast
Lili Taylor as Dawn
Stefania LaVie Owen as Melanie
Peyton List as Lacy
Ian Nelson as Daniel
David Rasche as Bill 
Max Casella as Gary
Michael Cyril Creighton as Mr. Wessler
Tom Papa as Howard
Jennifer Cody as Mrs. Jensen
Hunter Foster as Professor Stern
Deanna McKinney as Officer Gina Morales
Susannah Berryman as Psychiatrist
Tanya Thompson as Principal

Plot
Dawn (Lili Taylor) recently lost her husband and experiences growing anxiety as her daughter Melanie (Stefania Owen) plans to move away for college. An argument with a hostile new neighbor aggravates Dawn's mental condition, and she begins to show signs of paranoid delusions. Determined to help her mom, Melanie attempts a series of interventions, hoping that her guidance counselor (Michael Cyril Creighton), a private investigator (Max Casella) or even a new date (Tom Papa) may help, but to no avail. Melanie navigates her friendship with Lacy (Peyton List) and romance with the troubled Daniel (Ian Nelson) while trying to keep her mother afloat, but challenging Dawn's reality of persecution threatens to destroy their loving relationship. Melanie is forced to make the toughest of choices as she struggles to support her mother on the path toward recovery and healing.

Production
The film was shot in Syracuse, New York in May 2019.

Premiere
The film premiered at the Boston Film Festival on September 24, 2020, where it won the top prizes for Best Film, Best Actress (Lili Taylor), Best Screenplay and Best Ensemble Cast.

Release
The film was released on May 7, 2021 in select theaters and on VOD platforms. The release was slated for Mother's Day Weekend and Mental Health Awareness Month.

Reception
The review aggregator website Rotten Tomatoes surveyed 44 critics and, categorizing the reviews as positive or negative, assessed 44 as positive and 0 as negative for  rating. The critics consensus reads "A coming-of-age drama that thoughtfully handles hard-hitting themes, Paper Spiders is anchored by heartbreaking performances from its leads." The film was included on Rotten Tomatoes Top 10 Best Films of 2021, according to Tomatometer ranking.
Katie Walsh of the Los Angeles Times wrote: "Taylor plays Dawn’s slide into this mental health crisis beautifully, and with conviction, and Stefania Owen is stunning [...] Along with the emotionally stripped performances of Taylor and Owen, that personal experience brings a rare honesty and authenticity to this film about mental illness." Sheri Linden of The Hollywood Reporter called it "A message film spiked with welcome humor, and its excellent cast is led by the reliably compelling Lili Taylor".
Lili Taylor received a Gotham Award nomination for her Outstanding Lead Performance in the film.

References

External links
 
 
 

American drama films
2020 drama films
2020 films
2020s English-language films
2020s American films